The three L-1 0-8-8-0 steam locomotives of the Erie Railroad, built in July 1907 by ALCO, and numbered 2600, 2601 and 2602 (ALCo construction numbers 42269, 42270 and 42271 respectively); were unique in that they were the only articulated camelback locomotives ever built. 

When built in 1907, they were the largest steam locomotives in the world as the locomotive itself weighed 410,000 pounds (260 tons). The L-1 Class was also called the "Angus" Type in homage to Angus Sinclair, who was the publisher of Railway & Locomotive Engineering, a leading trade journal. A rarely seen photograph of #2602 shows his name under the windows on the cab sides. 

The use of an intercepting valve allowed the locomotive to be used in simple or single expansion steam capacity. This meant that if desired, high pressure steam could be supplied to the front and rear cylinder groups for additional power at the cost of exhausting the boiler of steam pressure quicker. 

These locomotives were built for "pusher" service, especially on the heavy grades of the Erie Railroads' Susquehanna Division over Gulf Summit on the Pennsylvania and New York State border; and these locomotives primarily operated between Port Jervis, NY, and Susquehanna, PA.

Pusher service is defined where additional locomotives are/were added to the rear of a train of which has its normal complement of locomotives on the lead end. The pusher locomotives then assist by helping push the train up the grade. Also, they helped control the stresses on the couplers and draft gear, and by which lowered the amount of broken coupler knuckles on a heavy train. In the modern diesel electric locomotive era, this pusher service could be compared to Distributed Power Units or DPU's. (However, DPU's are unmanned and electronically controlled by the lead locomotive.) Steam powered pusher locomotives were obviously manned, as the electronic technology did not exist in the early 1900s. Even diesel electric locomotives assigned to pusher service throughout the 1960s and 1970s were manned, as the technology was just budding for efficient unmanned and remote of locomotives.

Two Doors, One Fireman
Returning to the L-1; and contrary to popular belief, they were not fired by two firemen, but actually a single fireman. Most camelback locomotives, even the smaller switchers, have large fireboxes of the Wootten design for the use of anthracite coal. This is because to use anthracite, which is harder and slower burning than bituminous coal, a larger grate area is needed to achieve the same amount of heating as a smaller firebox that was suitable for bituminous coal use. 

As such, a conventional single door placed in the center of a firebox backhead (and as typically used on bituminous coal fired locomotives) would leave "blind spots" in the rear corners against the backhead of the larger Wootten fireboxes. This would induce uneven heating (cool spots) as the back corners would not receive coal nor could the fire be kept as even as it would be in the grate center because of being inaccessible by rake or shovel. Uneven heating in fireboxes was not only inefficient, but led to uneven expansion and contraction of the steel and would lead to shortened life of the firebox or even catastrophic failure.

Throughout the entire industry, an evenly banked fire over the entire fire grate is recognized as efficient firing for a steam locomotive (and stationary coal fired boilers). Installing two doors on the backheads of Wootten fireboxes alleviated this issue, and so a single fireman could tend to the fire on the extra wide fireboxes. Also, as the Erie L-1's were designed from the beginning as slow pusher locomotives, with an operating speed of 15 miles per hour and a maximum speed of 20 miles per hour, "fast and furious" coal shoveling was not necessary as it would be on a fast passenger locomotive (and as depicted in the movies), a single fireman was all that was required on the L-1 Class. 

(see diagram)

Baldwin Locomotive Works Rebuild
In 1921 the locomotives were sent out by Erie to be rebuilt by Baldwin Locomotive Works, as 2-8-8-2s with more conventionally rear located cabs, Standard DuPont Type B automatic mechanical stokers, Schmidt Type A superheaters, and Elasco feedwater heaters to make them more efficient. Also, the set of front driver cylinders was changed from slide valve type to piston valve type. 

But eventually the evolution of steam locomotive design surpassed even what could be achieved by this rebuild. The L-1's were retired in December 1930 and subsequently scrapped, in 1930. This retirement was due partially to age and wear of the boiler and original running gear. When held in comparison; the cost of re-boilering the locomotives as opposed to purchasing an all new locomotive, the cost savings was not substantial enough to warrant a second rebuild.

References

Further reading

External links
Erie Railroad L1 Class 0-8-8-0 locomotives, photos, postcards, models & memorabilia

L-1
ALCO locomotives
0-8-8-0 locomotives
Mallet locomotives
Steam locomotives of the United States
Railway locomotives introduced in 1907
Scrapped locomotives
Standard gauge locomotives of the United States
Freight locomotives